The 1970 AFC Youth Championship was held in Manila, Philippines.

Teams
The following teams entered the tournament:

 
 
 
 
 
 
 
 
 
 
  (host)
 
 
 
 
 

Note:  also entered, but withdrew before the draw due to internal dissent.

Group stage

Group A

Group B

Group C

Group D

Knockout stage

Quarter-finals

Semi-finals

Third place match

Final

Notes
1. The match was abandoned in the 47th minute after Thai player Sahus Pormswarn, who had been sent off, refused to leave the pitch.

References

 https://opac.perpusnas.go.id/uploaded_files/dokumen_isi3/Terbitan%20Berkala/Merdeka_1970_04_20_001.pdf

External links
Results by RSSSF

AFC U-19 Championship
AFC
1970 in Asian football
International association football competitions hosted by Malaysia
1970 in youth association football